The 1985 NCAA Division I Wrestling Championships were the 55th NCAA Division I Wrestling Championships to be held. The University of Oklahoma and Oklahoma State University co-hosted the tournament in Oklahoma City at the Myriad Convention Center.

Iowa took home the team championship with 145.25 points and having two individual champions.

Barry Davis of Iowa was named the Most Outstanding Wrestler and Darryl Peterson of Iowa State received the Gorriaran Award.

Team results

Individual finals

References

NCAA Division I Wrestling Championship
NCAA
Wrestling competitions in the United States
NCAA Division I  Wrestling Championships
NCAA Division I  Wrestling Championships
NCAA Division I  Wrestling Championships